Coover is a surname. Notable people with the surname include:

 Colleen Coover, comic book artist and author
 Harry Coover, American inventor 
 John Edgar Coover, Stanford parapsychologist
 Nancy Coover Andreasen, American neuroscientist
 Robert Coover, novelist and short story writer